First Light is an album by jazz trumpeter Freddie Hubbard.  Recorded in 1971, it features string arrangements by Don Sebesky. It was his third album released on Creed Taylor's CTI label and features performances by Hubbard, Herbie Hancock, Eric Gale, George Benson, Ron Carter, Jack DeJohnette, Airto Moreira and Richard Wyands. The album is part of a loose trilogy including his two previous records at the time, Red Clay and Straight Life. First Light won a 1972 Grammy Award for "Best Jazz Performance by a Group".

Reception
A reviewer for Dusty Groove said "Sweet early CTI work from trumpeter Freddie Hubbard – the kind of groundbreaking electric jazz that really helped him find a new space in the 70s! The album follows strongly from Freddie's classic Red Clay set for CTI – and like that one, it features extended tracks that build beautifully as they roll on – taking Freddie's airy trumpet as the base, and layering in electric piano, flute, guitar, and percussion – plus some wonderfully subtle strings – used sparely, but in just the right way to underscore the wider vision of the record".

Track listing
 "First Light" - 11:05 (Hubbard) 
 "Uncle Albert/Admiral Halsey" (P. McCartney, L. McCartney) - 8:17  
 "Moment to Moment" (Mancini, Mercer) - 5:43  
 "Yesterday's Dreams" (Martin, Sebesky) - 3:55  
 "Lonely Town" [from On the Town] (Bernstein, Comden, Green) - 7:00  
 "Fantasy in D" (Walton) - 6:55  
 "First Light - live Detroit 4th March 1973" - 16:04 (Hubbard) Bonus track on CD

Personnel

Freddie Hubbard – trumpet, flugelhorn
Herbie Hancock – Fender Rhodes piano
Richard Wyands – piano
George Benson – guitar
Ron Carter – bass
Jack DeJohnette – drums
Airto Moreira – percussion
Phil Kraus – vibraphone
Hubert Laws – flute
Wally Kane – flute, bassoon
George Marge – flute, clarinet
Romeo Penque – flute, English horn, oboe, clarinet
Jane Taylor – bassoon
Ray Alonge – French horn
James Buffington – French horn
Margaret Ross – harp
David Nadien – violin
Paul Gershman – violin
Emanuel Green – violin
Harold Kohon – violin
Joe Malin – violin
Gene Orloff – violin
Matthew Raimondi – violin
Tosha Samaroff – violin
Irving Spice – violin
Alfred Brown – viola
Emanuel Vardi – viola
Charles McCracken – cello
George Ricci – cello
Don Sebesky – arranger, conductor

References

External links
Genius: First Light

1971 albums
Freddie Hubbard albums
Albums conducted by Don Sebesky
Albums arranged by Don Sebesky
Albums produced by Creed Taylor
CTI Records albums
Jazz fusion albums by American artists
Grammy Award for Best Jazz Instrumental Album